Queen Mary's College is a government-run college in Chennai, India. Founded in 1914, it is the first women's college in the city and the third oldest women's college in India and second oldest in South India after Sarah Tucker College. 
The college is located on junction of Kamarajar Salai and Dr. Radhakrishnan Salai facing the Marina Beach. The college plays a vital role in education and empowerment of girl children from poor economic sections.

History
It was founded  by Dorothy de la Hey with the support of the  Governor of Madras Presidency  Lord Pentland in 1914 as  Madras College for Women. It was later renamed as Queen Mary's College  in 1917. The first three child widows to graduate from South India, Ammukutty, Lakshmi and Parvathy graduated from this college. Originally the residence of Lt Col Francis Capper in the mid-19th century, the building later housed a hotel before becoming a college in 1914. Known as the Capper House, the building was preserved as a heritage building. The college grew significantly under Dorothy de la Hey with many new buildings: Pentland House, Stone House and Jeypore House being built, and by 1923 Science subjects were also taught here. Physics and Chemistry laboratories were also built. In 1928, it was the first college in India to offer a two-year intermediate course in Indian music and in 1930 the music department was formally opened. By the time Dorothy de la Hey left in 1936 the college had grown significantly.  Capper House was later demolished to construct a new administrative office for the college known as the Kalaignar Maaligai, which was inaugurated in July 2010. After her, Miss Myers became the Principal till 1946. The first Indian Principal was Nallamuthu Ramamurthi.

Rankings 

Queen Mary's College was ranked 47 among colleges in India by National Institutional Ranking Framework (NIRF) in 2022.

Notable alumni 
 Yashodhara Dasappa, politician, Padma Bhushan receipt
 Kamaladevi Chattopadhyay, freedom fighter, Padma Vibhusan recipient
Indira Joseph Venniyoor, All India Radio broadcaster
 Janaki Ammal, scientist
 Lakshmi Sahgal, freedom fighter
 Charumathi Ramachandran, musician
 Nimi McConigley, first Indian American women to serve in any American State legislature
 Vani Jairam, musician
 Anuradha Sriram, musician
 M. Narmadha, musician
 A. Kanyakumari, musician
 R. Sivabhogam, first women chartered accountant in India

References

External links
 Queen Mary's College website
 QMC100

Arts and Science colleges in Chennai
Women's universities and colleges in Chennai
1914 establishments in India
Educational institutions established in 1914
Colleges affiliated to University of Madras